Proportion extend sort (abbreviated as PESort) is an in-place, comparison-based sorting algorithm which attempts to improve on the performance, particularly the worst-case performance, of quicksort.

The basic partitioning operation in quicksort has a linear access pattern which is extremely efficient on modern memory hierarchies, but the performance of the algorithm is critically dependent on the choice of a pivot value.  A good pivot will divide the data to be sorted into nearly-equal halves.  A poor choice will result in a grossly lopsided division, leaving one part almost as large as the original problem and causing  performance.

Proportion extend sort begins with a sorted prefix of  elements, then uses the median of that sample to partition the following  elements.  By bounding the size ratio  between the sample and the data being partitioned (i.e. the proportion by which the sorted prefix is extended), the imbalance is limited.  In this, it has some similarities to samplesort.

History 
Proportion extend sort was published by Jing-Chao Chen in 2001 as an improvement on his earlier proportion split sort design.  Its average-case performance, which was only experimentally measured in the original paper, was analyzed by Richard Cole and David C. Kandathil in 2004 and by Chen in 2006, and shown to require  comparisons on average.  A slightly refined variant, symmetry partition sort, was published in 2007.

Algorithm 
The algorithm begins with an array divided into a sorted part  adjacent to an unsorted part .  (The original proportion extend sort always had the sorted part precede the unsorted part; the symmetric variant allows either order.)  It is possible to begin with the first element as the sorted part (a single element is always sorted), or to sort a small number of elements using a simpler insertion sort.  The initially sorted elements may also be taken from across the array to improve performance in the case of pre-sorted data.

Next, and most critically, the length of the unsorted part  is bounded to a multiple  of the length of the sorted part .

If there is no limit on the unsorted part, then the algorithm is equivalent to quicksort.  If the unsorted part is of length 1 (almost), then the algorithm is equivalent to binary insertion sort.  Values around  give the best average-case performance, competitive with quicksort, while smaller values improve worst-case performance.

The final result  consists of two arrays of the necessary form (a sorted part adjacent to an unsorted part) and are sorted recursively.

Most of the implementation refinements used for quicksort can be applied, including techniques for detecting and efficiently handling mostly-sorted inputs.  In particular, sub-sorts below a certain size threshold are usually implemented using a simple insertion sort.

As with quicksort, the number of recursive levels can be limited to  if the smaller sub-sort is done first and the larger is implemented as a tail call.  Unlike quicksort, the number of levels is bounded by  even if this is not done.

Notes

References

External links 
 https://github.com/jingchaochen/Symmetry-Partition-Sort Example code

Comparison sorts

2001 in computing
Sorting algorithms